George Johnston "Dusty" Blair (September 15, 1929 – July 9, 2010) was a Canadian professional hockey player. He played two games in the National Hockey League with the Toronto Maple Leafs during the 1950–51 season. The rest of his career, which lasted from 1949 to 1965, was spent in various minor leagues.

Career 
Blair began his career when he signed with the Pittsburgh Hornets of the American Hockey League. He played with the Toronto Maple Leafs in the National Hockey Leaguefor two games, one more than his brother, Chuck Blair. He then went on to play in the OMHL, AHL, Maritime Major Hockey League, Quebec Senior Hockey League, Ontario Hockey Association, WHL, Eastern Professional Hockey League, and Eastern Hockey League. He retired with the Nashville Dixie Flyers after the 1964–65 season.

Career statistics

Regular season and playoffs

References

External links
 

1929 births
2010 deaths
Buffalo Bisons (AHL) players
Calgary Stampeders (WHL) players
Canadian expatriate ice hockey players in the United States
Canadian ice hockey centres
Clinton Comets players
Ice hockey people from Ontario
Los Angeles Monarchs players
Maritime Major Hockey League players
New Haven Blades players
Ontario Hockey Association Senior A League (1890–1979) players
Oshawa Generals players
Ottawa Senators (QSHL) players
Pittsburgh Hornets players
Providence Reds players
Sault Thunderbirds players
Sportspeople from Timmins
Toronto Maple Leafs players